General Andreas "Kat" Liebenberg,  (18 April 1938 – 23 May 1998) was a South African military commander. He served as General Officer Commanding South African Special Forces (1982–85), Chief of the Army (1985–90) and Chief of the South African Defence Force (1990–93).

Military career
Liebenberg joined the South African Army in 1955 and, after obtaining a BA Law degree at the University of Stellenbosch, was commissioned in 1961.

Liebenberg was posted to London as a military attache in 1969. In 1972, he returned from London to become second in command of the Army Gymnasium. Two years later he was back at Army Headquarters as a Staff Officer before becoming Director Infantry and, in December 1977, as a colonel, Officer Commanding 2 Military Area (later called Sector 10) at Oshakati. He stayed there till January 1980, when he became Director of Operations at Army Headquarters in the rank of brigadier.

Liebenberg served as General Officer Commanding South African Special Forces from 1982 to 1985, as Chief of the Army from 1985 to 1990, as Chief of Defence Force Staff for a few months in 1990, and then as Chief of the South African Defence Force from 1990 to 1993.  He was a member of the defence committee of the Transitional Executive Council which supervised the South African government during the final months leading up the first democratic election in 1994.

Trial
In 1995, Liebenberg, former defence minister, General Magnus Malan, and former defence force chief, General Jannie Geldenhuys were tried for murder, as a result of a military operation in which several civilians had been killed.  They were all acquitted.

Awards and decorations

References

|-

|-

|-

1938 births
1998 deaths
Afrikaner people
South African people of German descent
South African people of Dutch descent
Chiefs of the South African Army
South African military personnel of the Border War
Stellenbosch University alumni
People from Upington